Psilocnemis is a genus of myermecophilic beetles in the family Scarabaeidae, containing a single described species, P. leucosticta.

References

Further reading

 
 
 

Cetoniinae
Articles created by Qbugbot
Monotypic Scarabaeidae genera